Karyl is a given name that is a variant of Carol. 

Karyl Ross Harris, fullname of Ken Harris (1898 – 1982), American animator 
Karyl McBride American author and psychotherapist
Karyl Geld Miller, American screenwriter, political cartoonist and commentator
Karyl Norman stagename of George Francis Peduzzi (1897 – 1947), American female impersonator

See also

Karel (given name)
Karl (given name)
Karol (name)
Kary (name)
Karya (disambiguation)
KAYL (disambiguation)
Kryl (disambiguation)